Palerasnitsynus is a genus of extinct caddisfly that existed during the Late Albian Cretaceous of Myanmar. It is known from two specimens trapped in amber; one of these is of the type species Palerasnitsynus ohlhoffi, and the species of the second has not been identified.

References

Cretaceous insects
†
Prehistoric insect genera
Cretaceous insects of Asia
Burmese amber
Fossils of Myanmar